Hypamblys is a genus of parasitoid wasps belonging to the family Ichneumonidae.

The species of this genus are found in Europe and Northern America.

Species:
 Hypamblys albicruris (Gravenhorst, 1829) 
 Hypamblys albifacies (Provancher, 1888)

References

Ichneumonidae
Ichneumonidae genera